Nicolás Andrés Sánchez (born 21 February 1992) is an Argentine professional footballer who plays as a midfielder for Mitre.

Career
Sánchez started his youth career with Rivadavia de Junín in 1996, before joining Sarmiento and subsequently having a loan spell with Racing Club. His senior career began with Primera B Metropolitana club Sarmiento in 2010. He featured seventeen times over two seasons in Primera B Metropolitana, before making his first appearance in Primera B Nacional on 14 April 2013 during a 4–3 victory over Patronato. He scored his first goal for Sarmiento in May 2014 in a defeat to Huracán. In July 2016, after ninety-one appearances and two goals for Sarmiento, Sánchez departed to sign for fellow Primera División team Godoy Cruz.

He went on to score once in thirteen matches for Godoy Cruz during 2016–17 which they ended in fourteenth. On 18 August 2017, Sánchez joined Villa Dálmine of Primera B Nacional. He scored his first goal for Villa Dálmine in his sixth appearance, netting the second goal in a 2–1 win against Estudiantes. Sánchez completed a move to Mitre in June 2018.

Career statistics
.

References

External links

1992 births
Living people
People from Junín, Buenos Aires
Argentine footballers
Association football midfielders
Primera Nacional players
Argentine Primera División players
Club Atlético Sarmiento footballers
Godoy Cruz Antonio Tomba footballers
Villa Dálmine footballers
Club Atlético Mitre footballers
Sportspeople from Buenos Aires Province